Viivi Lehikoinen (born 27 August 1999) is a Finnish athlete. She competed in the women's 400 metres hurdles event at the 2020 Summer Olympics and at the 2022 World Championships.

Lehikoinen won a gold medal in the 400 metres hurdles at the 2016 European U18 Championships. In July 2017, at the age of 17, she won a bronze medal in the 400 metres hurdles at the 2017 European U20 Championships, breaking the Finnish under-20 record with a time of 56,49.

Personal bests 

 All information from World Athletics profile.

References

External links
 

1999 births
Living people
Finnish female hurdlers
Athletes (track and field) at the 2020 Summer Olympics
Olympic athletes of Finland
Place of birth missing (living people)
20th-century Finnish women
21st-century Finnish women